American Thunder is a wooden roller coaster located in the 1904 World's Fair section of Six Flags St. Louis in Eureka, Missouri. Opened on June 20, 2008, the coaster was originally named after and themed to the famous motorcycle daredevil Evel Knievel. It was renamed American Thunder for the 2011 season. To help promote the opening of the then-Evel Knievel Roller Coaster, Knievel's son, Robbie Knievel, jumped a Honda CR-500 motorcycle over 25 Dodge Chargers on July 3, 2008.

As a result of the St. Louis Cardinals losing to the Chicago Cubs in the 2015 National League Division Series, Six Flags St. Louis lost a friendly wager with Six Flags Great America, resulting in the temporary name change of the roller coaster to Cubs Thunder.

Ride experience 
This ride features 16 hills and multiple high banked turns at up to 67° angles. The layout crosses over and under itself seventeen times. This ride also features two 24-passenger Millennium Flyer trains for better cornering.

Awards

References

External links
American Thunder at Six Flags St. Louis Official page

Roller coasters operated by Six Flags
Six Flags St. Louis
Roller coasters introduced in 2008
Roller coasters in Missouri